Muslim Magnum .357: To Serve and Protect, also known as simply Muslim Magnum .357, is a 2014 Filipino action film directed by Francis 'Jun' Posadas and starring Jeorge "E.R." Estregan and Sam Pinto. It is a remake of the 1986 film Muslim .357 directed by and starring Fernando Poe Jr., to whom the film is dedicated.

Produced by Scenema Concept International, the film was released by Viva Films on December 25, 2014, as an entry to the 40th Metro Manila Film Festival.

Plot
Muslim princess Ameerah is kidnapped by an infamous crime group. Lt. Jamal Razul, a veteran police agent, aims to uncover who kidnapped the princess before Ameerah's family declares war with a rival clan they assume to be the culprits.

Cast
Jeorge "E.R." Estregan as Lt. Jamal Razul
Sam Pinto as Ameerah Naureen
Roi Vinzon as Bng. Gen. Gideon de Tagle
John Arcilla as Col. Jose Ramos
John Regala as Rasheed Abdul-Salam
Efren Reyes as Faruq Ghazi
Jon Hall
Clarence Delgado as Niko
Jerico Estregan as Sgt. Joselito Ibanez
Maria Ejercito as Mandy
Brenda Archangel as Hajah Brenda Abdul-Salam
Gwen Zamora as Yasmeen
Baron Geisler as Yusuf
Gerald Ejercito as Michael
Bernard Palanca as Clavio Esteban

Release
Muslim Magnum .357 was released on December 25, 2014, as part of the 40th Metro Manila Film Festival (MMFF).

Reception

Accolades

Box office
Among the eight entries to the MMFF, Muslim Magnum .357 is in the bottom four films in terms of box office gross.

References

External links

2014 films
2014 action films
Filipino-language films
Films about kidnapping
Philippine action films
Remakes of Philippine films
Films directed by Francis Posadas